Arthur Hamilton (born 1926) is an American songwriter.

Arthur Hamilton may also refer to:
Arthur Cole-Hamilton (1750–1810), Anglo-Irish politician
Arthur Francis Hamilton (1880–1965), officer of the Indian Medical Service and professor of obstetrics and gynaecology
Lord Arthur Hamilton (1883–1914), British Army officer and courtier
Arthur Hamilton (educator) (1886–1967), writer and professor of Spanish
Arthur Hamilton, Lord Hamilton (born 1942), Scottish judge
Arthur Hamilton (badminton) (born 1905), Irish badminton player
a pseudonym used by Horatio Alger